Motorola Krzr (styled KRZR), known as the "Canary" before its release, is a series of clamshell/flip mobile phones by Motorola, and is one of the series in the 4LTR line. The first phone was released in July 2006.

As a clamshell/flip phone, the Krzr is longer but narrower than the Motorola Razr.

K1

The Krzr series kicked off with the K1, announced on 1 July 2006, release on 10 July 2006. It was GSM only. The K1 used the motosync system to synchronize contacts and the calendar with the touch of a button. It also used the Push-To-View system for sharing of images in real-time.

The phone included stylized features such as a glossy glass finish.

A GSM/EDGE model was released by AT&T, Rogers Wireless, T-Mobile, SunCom Wireless and Cincinnati Bell Wireless under the name Motokrzr K1, and a CDMA 1x/EV-DO model was released by Pocket Communications,  Verizon Wireless, Sprint, US Cellular, Alltel, Virgin Mobile Canada and Boost Mobile under the name Motokrzr K1m.  The exact features and technical specifications differed significantly between models.

Specifications
 Bands (K1): GSM 850/900/1800/1900 (quad band) with EDGE (Class 10) / GPRS
 Dimensions (H x W x D) : 103 x 42 x 16 mm
 Mass: 100 g (3.6 ounces)
 Display: 176 x 220 262K-color TFT LCD
 Camera: 2.0-megapixel (1600x1200) with 8x digital zoom. MPEG-4 video CIF 352*288 (15 frames) and JPEG still image capture.
 Storage: 20 MB internal memory, MicroSD slot allows for  up to 2 GB external memory
 Audio Playback: Supports MP3, AAC, and AAC+
 Connectivity: Bluetooth 2.0, including A2DP stereo profile. Mini-USB.
 Push to Talk over Cellular (PoC) and Push to view (PTV) capable.
 Motorola SCREEN3 push technology for dynamic news and content.
 Java ME games and screen savers.
 Buttons (lightweight): TFT "L-tee" metal buttons with raised rubber padding for 5, up, down, left, right directions.
 Colors offered: cosmic blue, fire red, summit gold, silver quartz, dark gray, and black.

The complete Motorola Krzr K1 list of specifications are:

K1m
The K1m is the CDMA version of the K1. The main difference between the two is that the K1m has touch music controls on the flip cover, a 1.3 megapixel camera, supports a microSD memory card up to 1 GB, but does not have stereo Bluetooth headphone (A2DP) capabilities, whereas, the K1 doesn't have the touch music controls, but has a better, 2.0 megapixel camera, supports a MicroSD card up to a higher 2 GB, and is A2DP capable.

 Bands: CDMA 1x/EV-DO 800/1900
 Dimensions (H x W x D) : 103 x 44 x 17 mm
 Mass: 103 g (3.63 ounces)
 Display: 176 x 220 65K-color TFT LCD
 Camera: 1.3 megapixel (1280x1024) with 8x digital zoom. MPEG-4 video (15 frame/s) and JPEG still image capture.
 Storage: 20 MB internal memory, MicroSD slot allows for additional external memory
 Audio Playback: Supports MP3, MP4 with AAC encoding and WMA, although WMA is only available on models provided by Verizon Wireless and require the Verizon Wireless Music CD software to manage with a PC. Additionally there are external touch sensitive music controls on the front of the phone.
 Connectivity: Bluetooth 2.0, albeit without A2DP stereo profile;MiniUSB.
 Java ME or BREW (carrier dependent) games and screen savers.
 Offered in steel, black, white and red colors.

K3

The next Krzr phone was the K3, launched in February 2007. This phone is 3G-capable.

Specifications
 Bands (K1): GSM 900/1800/1900 (tri-band) with EDGE (Class 12) / GPRS, UMTS/HSDPA 2100
 Dimensions (H x W x D) : 103.2 x 42.3 x 16.3 mm
 Mass: 105 g
 Display: 240 x 320 262K-color TFT LCD
 Camera: 2.0-megapixel with 8x digital zoom. MPEG-4 video (15  frames) and JPEG still image capture.
 Storage: 60 MB internal memory, MicroSD slot allows for up to 2 GB external memory
 Audio Playback: Supports MP3
 Connectivity: Bluetooth 2.0, including A2DP stereo profile. Mini-USB.
 Java ME games and screen savers.
 Buttons (lightweight): TFT "L-tee" metal buttons with raised rubber padding for 5, up, down, left, right directions.
 Opera Mini browser

See also
Motorola RAZR
Motorola RIZR

External links
Motorola Krzr K1
Motorola Krzr K1m
Motorola Krzr K3
 Moto Krzr K1m (Verizon) - Cnet
 Motorola Krzr K1 Features - PhoneRide

Krzr
Mobile phones introduced in 2006